Pterophorus massai is a moth of the family Pterophoridae. It is found in Kenya.

The wingspan is about 25 mm. Adults have been recorded in August.

Etymology
The species is named after the type locality.

References

Endemic moths of Kenya
massai
Moths of Africa
Moths described in 1991